Mark Horenstein from the Boston University, Boston, MA was named Fellow of the Institute of Electrical and Electronics Engineers (IEEE) in 2016 for contributions to the modeling and measurements of electrostatics in industrial processes.

References

Fellow Members of the IEEE
Living people
Year of birth missing (living people)
Place of birth missing (living people)
Boston University faculty
American electrical engineers